"Do You See" is a song by American hip hop artist Warren G. It was released in November 1994 as the third and final single from his debut album, Regulate...G Funk Era. While not as successful as his previous two singles, "Do You See" nevertheless found some success on the Billboard charts, making it to 42 on the Billboard Hot 100, just missing the #40 spot which would have given three consecutive top 40 singles. The song found more success in the UK, making it to 29 on the country's singles chart.

The song uses the samples from "Juicy Fruit" by Mtume for the main beat and "Mama Used to Say" by Junior for the background tune. The spoken introduction is by Gil Scott-Heron, from the version of his spoken word "Bicentennial Blues" found on his live album It's Your World.

Single track listing

A-Side
"Do You See" (Clean LP Version)- 3:57  
"Do You See" (Instrumental)- 3:57

B-Side
"What's Next" (Clean LP Version)- 3:26  
"What's Next" (Instrumental)- 3:26

Charts

References

1994 singles
Warren G songs
G-funk songs
1994 songs
Def Jam Recordings singles
Songs written by Warren G